Kamień Górowski is a village in the administrative district of Gmina Wąsosz, within Góra County, Lower Silesian Voivodeship, in south-western Poland.

The village has a population of 290.

References

Villages in Góra County